The 1888 American Cup was the fourth edition of the soccer tournament organized by the American Football Association.  Having expanded into the New England district the first new champions came from Fall River, Massachusetts after Clark ONT of Newark had won the previous three editions. The Rovers defeated the Newark Almas in the final.

Participants
Previously only the New York and New Jersey districts were represented. With the addition of the New England district, the tournament now included five new teams from three different states. Ansonia cricket and football club, organized in 1885, played out of Derby Driving Park wore navy blue jerseys and white knickerbockers. The East End football club, organized in 1882, played out of the County Street grounds and wore navy shirts and white shorts. The Fall River Rovers, organized in 1884, playing at Oak Grove Avenue wore gold jerseys, blue knickerbockers and red socks. The Pawtucket Free Wanderers were organized in 1885 and wore navy jerseys with white knickerbockers. Newark Caledonian football club was organized in 1885 and wore royal blue jerseys with white knickerbockers. The Providence cricket and football club, organized in 1886, wore light and dark blue jerseys, white knickerbockers and blue socks. The fifteen entrants were as follows:  
New Jersey- Trenton, Paterson, Clark O.N.T., Alma, Tiffany Rovers, Kearny Rangers, and Newark Caledonian. 
New York- Riverside, Thistle, and New York.
New England- Ansonia, Providence Athletics, Pawtucket Free Wanderers, Fall River Rovers, Fall River East Ends.

First round
The draw was held on September 17, 1887. In order to reduce travel the teams were drawn in two sections with the Rhode Island and Massachusetts teams in the first section and the remaining teams in the second section. Riversides drew a bye.  The second round was drawn on October 29, 1887.

Rovers: GK J.Clancy, DF T.Crann, W.Flanning, MF M.O'Hara, J.Selby, D.Dwyer, FW C.Gray, A.Hinckley, W.Hinckley, J.Morton, M.Down. Paterson: GK W.Doney, DF J.Smallwood, B.Henshall, MF J.Henshall, G.Henshall, FW T.Bisland, T.Evans, H.Curry, W.Warburton, W.Wyatt, J.Sutton

Trenton: GK Mart, FB Allman, Rhodes, HB James, Baddely, McNichol, FW Openshaw(c), Cooper, Byatt, Bagley, Ward. O.N.T.: GK Hughes, FB Holden, Pollister, HB Howarth, Joseph Swithemby, Dockery, FW John Swithemby(c), Swarbrick, Fisher, Connolly, McGurck.

Alma: GK Frank Farrow, DF George Wright, F.McDonald, MF E.Morton, F.Britchford, R.Pattison, FW Joseph Lucas, F.Cornall, Thomas Bright, John Gray, P.Brennan. Caledonian: GK H.Eddis, DF W.McCormick, John Hood, MF J.Lindsay, John Hearne, W.McNeil, FW J.McWilliams, J.Low, S.Hood, R.Barr, James Hearne.

Rovers: G Long, FB Lonsdale, Bradley, HB Thomas, Waring, Adams, RW Bed, Blakely, LW Wild, Duff, C Buckley. East Ends: G Bracknell, FB Whittle, Karzenski, HB Coupe, Shoarocks, Lord, RW Wild, Whittle, LW King, Darlington, C Foley.

Providence: GK Crone, DF Jack North, Osborne, MF Jerome, Morgan, Tomlinson, FW Such, Start, Axon, Ambler, Heliborne.
Pawtucket: GK Bosch, DF Smith, Reye, MF Conley, Pilling, Jack McGuire, FW Hardy, Harry Stewart, John Stewart, Sunderland, Lennox.

Second round
Clark ONT had experienced their first cup-tie loss at the hands of the Almas. ONT lodged a protest on two counts. The first goal obtained by the Almas was awarded by the referee when a shot at goal was struck by Holden with his arm. ONT alleged that the foul was not properly done. The second issue concerned a goal by ONT that was disallowed since it was from a free kick. ONT claimed that the ball was touched by Jack Swithemby before Howarth scored. At a meeting the following week, the AFA did not sustain the referee's decisions and called for a replay. 

Alma: GK Frank Farrow, DF F.McDonald, B.Fagan, MF E.Morton, F.Britchford, George Wright, FW F.Cornall, Joseph Lucas, Thomas Bright, A.Mountford, John Gray. O.N.T.: GK Patrick Hughes, DF Harry Holden, A.Pallister, MF James Howarth, Joe Swithemby, P.Flynn, FW Joseph Swarbrick, J.Connolly, Jack Swithemby, James McGurck, Harry Fisher.   

Rovers: GK Lang, DF Lonsdale, Bradley, MF Waring, Buckley, Adams, FW Bell, Brookshaw, Wilde, Duff, Blakely. Pawtucket: GK Booth, DF Smith, J.Stewart, MF Pilling, Love, Conley, FW Harding, H.Stewart, Sandilands, McGuire, Lennox.

Rangers: GK J.Smith, DF E.Walker, William Lines, MF Roderick McDonald, T.Spencer, William Allsopp, FW Walter Taylor, George Sargeant, J.Campbell, W.Turner, E.Stark. Ansonia: GK W.Winfield, DF C.Williams(c), J.Williams, MF E.Wood, J.Lewis, J.Davidson, FW C.Williams, G.Bell, C.Wood, A.Wherle, M.McHale.

replay

Semifinals

Rovers: GK Mullen, DF Bradley, Lonsdale, MF Buckley, Waring, Adams, FW Bell, Bruckshaw, Blakeley, Wilde, Duff. Rangers: GK J.H.Smith, DF W.Lines, L.Walker, MF Roderick McDonald, H.Bennett, William Allsop, FW W.Taylor, George Sargent, T.Spencer, A.Campbell, E.Stark.

Alma: GK H.Farron, DF E.Morton, F.McDonald, MF P.Fagin, F.Britchford, R.Patterson, FW P.Brennan, Joseph Lucas, Thomas Bright, H.Maxfield, John Gray.

Final

American Cup bracket

Champions

References

Sources
Outing
National Police Gazette
New York Herald
New York Times
Spirit of the Times
Trenton Times
Fall River Herald
Daily Advertiser
Evening News
Sunday Call

1888
1888 in association football
1888 in American sports